The Bride Wore Black is a 1968 French film directed by François Truffaut and based on the novel of the same name by William Irish, a pseudonym for Cornell Woolrich. It stars Jeanne Moreau, Charles Denner, Alexandra Stewart, Michel Bouquet, Michael Lonsdale, Claude Rich and Jean-Claude Brialy. The costumes were by Pierre Cardin.

It is a revenge film in which a deranged widow murders the man who accidentally shot her husband on her wedding day, as well as his four friends. She wears only white, black or a combination of the two.

Plot
As the film opens, Julie Kohler (Jeanne Moreau) tries to throw herself out of an upstairs window, but is stopped by her mother (Luce Fabiole). Julie is dressed in black and is obviously grief-stricken. In the next scene, she is more composed, telling her mother she is going on a long trip, and counting out five piles of money. She gets onto a train, but right afterwards steps down on the opposite side, hidden from onlookers.

The next time Julie is seen, her hair is different, she is wearing white, and looking for a man called Bliss (Claude Rich). He is a ladies' man who is having a party on the eve of his wedding. When Julie arrives, aloof but attractive, he cannot resist approaching her. When they are alone on the balcony of Bliss's high-rise apartment, she tells him her name and pushes him off the balcony.

Her next victim is Coral (Michel Bouquet), a lonely bachelor. She lures him to a concert and they agree to meet the following night. Before their rendezvous, Julie buys a bottle of arak and injects a syringe of poison into it. When she meets Coral at his apartment, she serves him the drink. When he collapses in agony, she reveals her identity to him. He begs for his life, explaining that it was all an accident. In a flashback, there is a wedding procession on the steps of a church; a single shot rings out and the groom falls to the ground. Julie is the widowed bride.

The next man is Morane (Michel Lonsdale) a would-be politician. She follows his wife and young son home, befriends the boy, and gets the wife to leave by sending a fake telegram that the wife's mother is ill. Julie poses as the boy's teacher Miss Becker, and offers to cook dinner for Morane and his son. Afterwards she plays hide-and-seek with the boy, hiding in an enclosed small closet underneath the stairs, before putting the boy to bed. As she is leaving the house, she pretends that she has lost her ring. Morane helps her search, crawling into the closet where she had hidden earlier. She slams the door and locks him inside. Julie reveals her true identity, and he pleads for his life, saying what happened was an accident.

Another flashback reveals that Julie's husband was killed by a rifle shot fired by Delvaux (Daniel Boulanger), member of an informal hunting club that also included Bliss, Coral, Morane and Fergus. The five men were carelessly horsing around with a loaded rifle in an upper room across the street from the church. After the incident, they went their separate ways, intending never to reveal their involvement in the groom's death. Remorseless, Julie uses duct tape to seal the door of Morane's closet, and he suffocates to death.

Julie waits in Delvaux's junkyard, planning to kill him with a handgun, but he is arrested by the police. Julie moves on to find the fifth member of the hunting group: Fergus (Charles Denner), an artist. Julie models for him as the huntress Diana, eventually shooting him in the back with an arrow. She cuts her face out of his painting to remove the only evidence of her presence. When she discovers that Fergus had painted a mural on his wall depicting her reclining in the nude, she gets some paint to cover the mural's face, but hears someone coming and has to leave.

Julie attends Fergus' funeral and allows herself to be arrested. She admits that she murdered the four men, but refuses to reveal her motives.

Inside a prison, a meal cart is making its rounds. Julie is a prisoner in the women's wing, and Delvaux is on the men's side. When Julie works in the kitchen, she hides a knife. When the cart makes its rounds with Julie as one of the attendants, it turns a corner out of our sight. After a brief pause, a man's scream is heard.

Cast

 Jeanne Moreau as Julie Kohler  
 Michel Bouquet as Coral  
 Jean-Claude Brialy as Corey  
 Charles Denner as Fergus  
 Claude Rich as Bliss  
 Michel Lonsdale as Clément Morane   
 Daniel Boulanger as Delvaux  
 Serge Rousseau as David
 Alexandra Stewart as Mlle Becker
 Christophe Bruno as Cookie Morane

Critical reaction
The film received hostile criticism in France on its original release, and Truffaut later admitted that he no longer liked the film, and that the critics were right. Eventually, the movie received better reviews, and currently has an 83% approval rating on Rotten Tomatoes from critics. During the 1983 Chicago International Film Festival, Truffaut was asked which of his films he would change if he could. He named this film, saying that it was the first time "we" had worked in color and the emotional tone of many scenes came out wrong.  In fact, two years earlier, Truffaut had made Fahrenheit 451 in England in color with Nicolas Roeg as his cinematographer.  Clarification became available in 2009, when Robert Osborne introduced Turner Classic Movies' showing of The Bride Wore Black.  Cinematographer Raoul Coutard, who had worked with Truffaut on five previous films, had already made several color films with Jean-Luc Godard and had his own ideas on shooting.  Coutard and Truffaut had multiple day-long arguments, and in many scenes direction to the actors was provided by the film's star, Jeanne Moreau.  At the film's premiere, Truffaut was tormented by the contrast between the emotional notes he had intended to give the actors and the finished film, but he was too discreet in 1983 to admit the depths of his disappointment or to blame Coutard even indirectly.

John Simon described The Bride Wore Black as  "a piece of junk".

Roger Ebert's review in The Chicago Sun-Times was more positive, giving The Bride Wore Black 3.5 stars out of a possible 4. He praised Moreau's performance and wrote that, with the obvious tributes to Alfred Hitchcock throughout the film, Truffaut had succeeded in creating "a marriage of the French new wave and Hollywood tradition".

Despite the mixed critical reaction, it was nominated for a Golden Globe Award for Best Foreign Language Film. The film was also a financial success, having 1,274,411 and 867,293 cinema admissions in France and Spain respectively. In addition the film grossed $2,000,000 in rentals worldwide, $1.75 million of which came from outside North America.

It earned rentals of $32,000 in the US.

Awards and nominations

Influence
The 1970 Jesus Franco film She Killed in Ecstasy, starring Soledad Miranda as the vengeful bride, has the same premise, but approaches the story in a more linear fashion.

It inspired the 1971 Turkish film Melek mi, Şeytan mı.

It inspired the 1976 Hindi film Nagin.  The film was also the inspiration for Kate Bush's song "The Wedding List" on her album Never for Ever.

Although Kill Bill by Quentin Tarantino tells a story with some similarities, such as the notebooks in which the brides cross off their victims' names once they have killed them, Tarantino has stated that he has never seen The Bride Wore Black.

References

External links
 
 
 
 
 The Bride Wore Black at MGM Movie Database
  La Mariée était en noir at ALLOCINE.com
  "Η Νύφη φορούσε μαύρα" at in.gr

1968 films
1960s psychological thriller films
French films about revenge
Films based on American novels
Films based on crime novels
Films based on works by Cornell Woolrich
Films directed by François Truffaut
Films scored by Bernard Herrmann
French psychological thriller films
1960s French-language films
Films with screenplays by François Truffaut
French serial killer films
United Artists films
1960s French films